Khun Sorkh (also Romanized as Khūn Sorkh and Khūn-e Sorkh) is a village in Saghder Rural District, Jebalbarez District, Jiroft County, Kerman Province, Iran. At the 2006 census, its population was 33, in 7 families.

References 

Populated places in Jiroft County